The TSX Venture 50 is a yearly ranking done by the TMX Group of 50 upcoming companies on the TSX Venture Exchange.

The list is chosen annually by assigning equal weighting assigned to share price appreciation, trading volume, market capitalization growth and analyst coverage.

2020 TSX Venture 50
The 2020 TSX Venture 50 was released on December 31, 2019. The top performing companies from each industry sector are:

Entry in italic text indicates number 1 company overall

2019 TSX Venture 50
The 2019 TSX Venture 50 was released on December 31, 2018. The top performing companies from each industry sector are:

Entry in italic text indicates number 1 company overall

2018 TSX Venture 50
The 2018 TSX Venture 50 was released on December 31, 2017. The top performing companies from each industry sector are:

Entry in italic text indicates number 1 company overall

2017 TSX Venture 50
The 2017 TSX Venture 50 was released on December 31, 2016. The top performing companies from each industry sector are:

Entry in italic text indicates number 1 company overall

The full list of companies in the 2017 TSX Venture 50 is:

2016 TSX Venture 50
The 2016 TSX Venture 50 was released on December 31, 2015. The top performing companies from each industry sector are:

Entry in italic text indicates number 1 company overall

2015 TSX Venture 50
The 2015 TSX Venture 50 was released on December 31, 2014. The top performing companies from each industry sector are:

Entry in italic text indicates number 1 company overall

2014 TSX Venture 50
The 2014 TSX Venture 50 was released on February 12, 2014. The top performing companies from each industry sector are:

Entry in italic text indicates number 1 company overall

2013 TSX Venture 50
The 2013 TSX Venture 50 was released on February 13, 2013. The top performing companies from each industry sector are:

Entry in italic text indicates number 1 company overall

2012 TSX Venture 50
The 2012 TSX Venture 50 was released on February 15, 2012. The top performing companies from each industry sector are:

Entry in italic text indicates number 1 company overall

The full list of companies in the 2012 TSX Venture 50 is:

2011 TSX Venture 50
The 2011 TSX Venture 50 was released on 31 December 2010. The top performing companies from each industry sector are:

Entry in italic text indicates number 1 company overall

See also
 TSX Venture Exchange
 S&P/TSX 60
 S&P/TSX Composite

References

External links
 TSX Venture 50

Canadian stock market indices
TSX Venture Exchange